Martin Monnickendam (25 February 1874 – 4 January 1943) was a Dutch painter and draftsman.

Life
Monnickendam was born in Amsterdam and trained at the Rijksakademie van beeldende kunsten there from 1891. His early work is mostly animal drawings made at Natura Artis Magistra. He continued his studies in Paris at the École des Arts et Métiers from 1895. He won various awards and took study trips to London and Italy. Today, his work is seen as being in the school of George Breitner.

He became a member of Arti et Amicitiae in 1904 and a member of the Vereeniging Sint Lucas in 1905. He became a teacher in Amsterdam at the international painting academy there. In 1924 on the occasion of his 50th birthday an honorary show was held for him at the Stedelijk Museum  and in 1934 he was named officer in the Order of Orange-Nassau.

His work was part of the art competitions at the 1924 Summer Olympics and the 1928 Summer Olympics. He also won a medal at the Paris World Exposition in 1937.

Monnickendam died in Amsterdam in 1943 in straitened circumstances while waiting to be deported as a Jew. In 2009 a show of his works was held in Amsterdam city archives.

Works
His works are held by Joods Historisch Museum, Rijksmuseum, the Stadsarchief Amsterdam, the Gemeentemuseum Den Haag and the Amsterdam Museum.

References

Further reading 
 "Monnickendam, Martin". In: Hans Vollmer (ed.): Allgemeines Lexikon der Bildenden Künstler von der Antike bis zur Gegenwart. Begründet von Ulrich Thieme und Felix Becker. Band 25: Moehring–Olivié. E. A. Seemann, Leipzig 1931, p. 69
 "Monnickendam, Martin". In: Hans Vollmer (ed.): Allgemeines Lexikon der bildenden Künstler des XX. Jahrhunderts. Band 3: K–P. E. A. Seemann, Leipzig 1956, p. 414
 R. J. C. van Helden: Catalogus Martin Monnickendam 1874–1943. Waanders, Zwolle 2009, 
 R. J. C. van Helden / Hellmuth Möhring: Martin Monnickendam – Amsterdamer Chronist in Licht und Farbe. Katalog zur Sonderausstellung im Rothenburg Museum, Rothenburg ob der Tauber 2019
 Mayari Granados / Jürgen Scheffler / Fabian Schröder (ed.): Reiselust. Der Amsterdamer Künstler Martin Monnickendam in Lippe und im Weserbergland 1923. Verlag für Regionalgeschichte ein Imprint von Aschendorff Verlag, Bielefeld 2020 (Schriften des Städtischen Museums Lemgo; 20),

External links 
 Official website of the Stichting Vrienden van de schilder Martin Monnickendam, Amsterdam
 Kunstbus.nl - Martin Monnickendam

1874 births
1943 deaths
Painters from Amsterdam
Dutch painters
Dutch male painters
Jewish painters
Dutch Jews
Olympic competitors in art competitions